Uliyin Osai is a 2008 Indian Tamil-language period drama film directed by Ilavenil, written by Karunanidhi, and produced by S. P. Murugesan. The film stars starring Vineeth, Keerthi Chawla, and Akshaya, while Sarath Babu, Manorama, Kovai Sarala, and Ganja Karuppu play supporting roles. The soundtrack album and background score were composed by Ilaiyaraaja  with cinematography by B. Kannan and editing by Suresh Urs. The film released on 4 July 2008.

Plot
The story is set in 1005 AD. Raja Raja Chozhan and his son Rajendra Chozhan are benevolent rulers of the Chozha dynasty. As a mark of respect to the gods, they want to build a temple in Thanjavur. They appoint the master sculptor Iniyan, a handsome young man who is also a good dancer, to do the sculpture work for the big temple. However, Iniyan finds the palace 'narthaki' Muthunagai not up to the mark and is unable to find the right girl to pose as the model for his sculpture work. Meanwhile, he meets a village girl Chamundi, who is said to be the granddaughter of a shepherd woman Azhagi, who is not only beautiful but has an hourglass-like figure and dances like a dream. Iniyan slowly falls in love with his 'model', and when he expresses his love for her, she spurns it as she is the Queen herself. An absolutely shattered sculptor in a moment of remorse does something which is shocking and is the real twist in the tale.

Cast
Vineeth as Iniyan
Keerthi Chawla as Chamundi
Akshaya as Muthunagai
Sarath Babu as Raja Raja Chola I
Manorama as Azhagi
Kovai Sarala as Sokki
Ganja Karuppu as Soodamani
Thalaivasal Vijay as Manikandan
Bala Singh as Brammarayar
Suja Varunee

Soundtrack
The soundtrack was composed by Ilaiyaraaja, and lyrics were written by Vaali, Muthulingam, Kamakodiyan, Mu. Metha, Pazhani Bharathi, Snehan and Na. Muthukumar.

Critical reception
The movie opened with a promising note but mostly got negative reviews.

Awards
Karunanidhi received the Tamil Nadu State award in 2008 as best dialogue writer.
Kovai Sarala received the Tamil Nadu State award in 2008 for best comedian.

References

2008 films
Films scored by Ilaiyaraaja
2000s Tamil-language films
Films with screenplays by M. Karunanidhi
Indian historical drama films
Films set in the 11th century
1005 in Asia